Phoenix High School may refer to:

United States
 ASU Preparatory Academy, Phoenix High School, Phoenix, Arizona
 Phoenix High School (Lincoln, California), Lincoln, California
 Phoenix High School (San Jose, California), San Jose, California
 Phoenix High School, a Small Learning Community within Rancho Cotate High School in Rohnert Park, California
 Phoenix High School (Dalton, Georgia)
 Phoenix High School (Lawrenceville, Georgia)
 Phoenix High School (Louisiana), Braithwaite, Louisiana
 Phoenix High School (Michigan), Kalamazoo, Michigan
 Phoenix High School (New York), Phoenix, New York
 Phoenix High School (Oregon), Phoenix, Oregon

United Kingdom
Phoenix High School, London, UK

See also
 Phoenix Indian School, later Phoenix Indian High School, Phoenix, Arizona